The WWL Super Cruiserweight Championship or in Spanish Campeonato Super Crucero De La WWL is a professional wrestling championship promoted by the World Wrestling League (WWL) promotion in Puerto Rico.

The championship is generally contested in professional wrestling matches, in which participants execute scripted finishes rather than contend in direct competition.

Title history
After Mark Davidson vacated the title, it was announced on a press conference that a "Copa Super Crucero" tournament would start on "Destino Final" and it would end on "Pena Capital" the first PPV announced for Fite.TV and the winner of this tournament would be the new champion

References

World Wrestling League Championships
Cruiserweight wrestling championships